Tauseeq Haider (born 19 February 1970) is a Pakistani radio and television anchor, show host, and actor. He has the honour of being the first voice to be aired on FM Radio. Currently, he anchors a morning show "Rising Pakistan" on PTV Home.

Life and career
Tauseeq was born on 19 February 1970 in Rawalpindi.

He started his career as an English newscaster at Radio Pakistan in 1987. When Radio Pakistan experimentally started its FM channel in 1993, he was the first anchor to be aired on it. Later, he presented many programs on radio and hosted several talk shows on Pakistan Television. Presently, he is anchoring a morning show "Rising Pakistan" at PTV home.

He also works as a public communication trainer and attended a training workshop on “How to become a good Compere / Presenter”, held in March 2022 at Pakistan Broadcasting Academy, Islamabad.

Recently, Tauseeq has been cast in a forthcoming Turkish drama Koyu Beyaz along with actress Atiqa Odho.

Television shows

Awards and recognition
In August 2022, Tauseeq was honored by Radio Pakistan with Superstar Award on occasion of the Diamond Jubilee Awards 2022 ceremony.

References

1970 births
Living people
People from Rawalpindi
Pakistani television hosts
Pakistani radio presenters